Donella is a genus of flowering plants belonging to the family Sapotaceae.

Its wide native range extends from tropical and subtropical Old World to northern Queensland. It is found in (listed alphabetically) Angola, Assam, Bangladesh, Benin, Borneo, Cambodia, Cameroon, Central African Republic, China, Republic of Congo, Democratic Republic of the Congo, Eswatini, Gabon, Ghana, Guinea, Hainan, India, Ivory Coast, Java, Kenya, KwaZulu-Natal, Laos, Liberia, Madagascar, Malawi, Malaya, Mozambique, Myanmar, New Guinea, Nigeria, Philippines, Queensland, Rwanda, Sierra Leone, Solomon Island, Sri Lanka, Sulawesi, Sumatra, Tanzania, Thailand, Uganda, Vietnam, Zambia, and Zimbabwe.

Its genus name of Donella, is in honour of George Don (1798–1856), a Scottish botanist and plant collector, and it was published in Hist. Pl. Vol.11 o page 294 in 1891.

Species
Known species:

Donella ambrensis  – northern Madagascar
Donella analalavensis  – northwestern and northern Madagascar
Donella bangweolensis  – Angola, Democratic Republic of the Congo, Zambia, and Tanzania
Donella capuronii  – northeastern Madagascar
Donella delphinensis  – eastern Madagascar
Donella fenerivensis  – northeastern Madagascar
Donella guereliana  – western and northern Madagascar
Donella humbertii  – western and north-central Madagascar
Donella lanceolata  – northern and eastern Madagascar
Donella masoalensis  – northeastern Madagascar
Donella ogoouensis  – Gabon
Donella perrieri  – Madagascar
Donella pruniformis  – western and central Africa to Uganda
Donella ranirisonii  – northeastern Madagascar
Donella ubangiensis  – western and central Africa to Uganda
Donella viridifolia  – KwaZulu-Natal, Eswatini, Mozambique, Malawi, and Kenya
Donella welwitschii  – western and central Africa to Angola and Zambia

References

 
Sapotaceae genera
Plants described in 1891
Paleotropical flora